Cégep du Vieux Montréal is a CEGEP (Collège d'enseignement général et professionnel, or College of General and Vocational Education) located at 255 Ontario Street East, in Montreal, Quebec, Canada.
The College of General and Vocational Education is affiliated with the ACCC and CCAA.

History

In 1967, several institutions were merged and became public, when the Quebec system of CEGEPs was created. Established in 1968, it was composed of five distinct pavilions. Since 1976, it has been regrouped into a single, 11-story building, but with three secondary pavilions.

Programs
The CEGEP offers two types of programs: pre-university and technical. The pre-university programs, which take two years to complete, cover the subject matter which roughly corresponds to the additional year of high school given elsewhere in Canada in preparation for a chosen field in university, as well as an introductory specialization that generally happens in freshman year. The technical programs, which take three years to complete, apply to students who wish to pursue a skill or trade. Continuing education and services to business are also provided.

Notable alumni
 Claire Beaugrand Champagne - photographer
 Julie Doucet - underground cartoonist/artist
 Alain Kashama - CFL player
 Amir Khadir - MNA for Quebec Solidaire
 Marie-Josée Croze - actress
 Nathalie Daoust - photographer
 Benjamin St-Juste - American football player

See also
List of colleges in Quebec
Higher education in Quebec

References

External links

  

Vieux Montreal
Universities and colleges in Montreal
Colleges in Quebec
Educational institutions established in 1968
1968 establishments in Quebec
Quartier Latin, Montreal